The 1951 Arizona Wildcats football team represented the University of Arizona in the Border Conference during the 1951 college football season.  In their third and final season under head coach Bob Winslow, the Wildcats compiled a 6–5 record (3–3 against Border opponents) and were outscored by their opponents, 270 to 246. The team captains were Jim Donarski and Bill Glazier.  The team played its home games in Arizona Stadium in Tucson, Arizona.

Schedule

References

Arizona
Arizona Wildcats football seasons
Arizona Wildcats football